Hudson Bay (Inuinnaqtun: Tahiuyaryuaq) is a territorial electoral district (riding) for the Legislative Assembly of Nunavut, Canada.

The riding consists of the community of Sanikiluaq.

The current Member of the Legislative Assembly is Daniel Qavvik.

Election results

1999 election

2004 election

2008 election

2013 election

2017 election

References

External links
Website of the Legislative Assembly of Nunavut

Electoral districts of Qikiqtaaluk Region
1999 establishments in Nunavut